This is the complete list of men's Olympic medalists in gymnastics.

Artistic gymnastics

Current program

All-around, individual

All-around, team

Floor exercise

Horizontal bar

Parallel bars

Pommel horse

Rings

Vault

Discontinued events

Club swinging

Combined 4 events

Free system, team

Horizontal bar, team

Indian clubs

Parallel bars, team

Rope climbing

Sidehorse vault

Swedish system, team

Triathlon

Tumbling

Trampoline

Individual

See also

Gymnastics at the 1906 Intercalated Games — these Intercalated Games are no longer regarded as official Games by the International Olympic Committee
List of Asian Games medalists in gymnastics
List of top Olympic gymnastics medalists

References

International Olympic Committee results database

Gymnastics (men)
Gymnastics (men)
Olympic medalists

Lists of medalists in gymnastics